Momentary Masters is the third solo studio album by American musician Albert Hammond Jr. released on July 31, 2015.

Track listing
All songs written by Albert Hammond Jr. except 6, by Bob Dylan

References

2015 albums
Albert Hammond Jr. albums
Infectious Music albums
Vagrant Records albums